Souris—Moose Mountain is a federal electoral district in Saskatchewan, Canada, that has been represented in the House of Commons of Canada since 1988.

Geography
This electoral district is located in Southeast Saskatchewan, encompassing the cities of Weyburn and Estevan. The riding extends from Radville in the west to the Manitoba border, and from Estevan to Grenfell and the Qu'Appelle River in the north.

History
This district was created in 1987 from Qu'Appelle—Moose Mountain and portions of the Assiniboia riding.

This riding lost a fraction of territory to Moose Jaw—Lake Centre—Lanigan and gained significant territory from Wascana during the 2012 electoral redistribution.

Members of Parliament

Current Member of Parliament
Its Member of Parliament is Robert Kitchen, a medical practitioner in Estevan who was elected in the 2015 Canadian federal election and re-elected in 2019.

Election results

See also
 List of Canadian federal electoral districts
 Past Canadian electoral districts

References

Notes

External links
 Riding history for Souris—Moose Mountain (1987– ) from the Library of Parliament
 Expenditures – 2008
 Expenditures – 2004
 Expenditures – 2000
 Expenditures – 1997

Saskatchewan federal electoral districts
Estevan
Weyburn